Chelsea is a small neighborhood located on the West Shore of Staten Island in New York City. It is bordered on the north by South Avenue, on the east by the William T. Davis Wildlife Refuge, on the south by Meredith Avenue, and on the west by the Arthur Kill.

The area was originally named Pralltown after a family that was granted land there in 1675. During the Revolutionary period it was called Peanutville due to the storage there of quantities of peanuts for the passengers using the ferries to travel between New York and New Brunswick.

Chelsea is mostly open marsh and is relatively undeveloped, although there are some businesses and one-family houses. It borders on the Teleport and is the site of Staten Island's West Shore Plaza and the Metropolitan Transportation Authority's Meredith Avenue Bus Depot. Chelsea is served by the  local buses and the  express bus.

References

External links

Neighborhoods in Staten Island